Linton is an unorganized territory in the Capitale-Nationale region of Quebec, Canada, in the north of the Portneuf Regional County Municipality. It is named after the hamlet of Linton that is located along the Canadian National Railway and the Batiscan River.

Demographics
Population trend:
 Population in 2021: 10 (2016 to 2021 population change: N/A)
 Population in 2016: 0 
 Population in 2011: 0 
 Population in 2006: 32
 Population in 2001: 0
 Population in 1996: 0
 Population in 1991: 0

Private dwellings occupied by usual residents: 7 (total dwellings: 49)

References

Unorganized territories in Capitale-Nationale